Thomas Francis Hall (April 3, 1940 - December 14, 2017) was a National Football League wide receiver. He played eight seasons for the Detroit Lions (1962–1963), the Minnesota Vikings (1964–1966, 1968–1969), and the New Orleans Saints (1967). He played college football at the University of Minnesota.

In 1980, Hall was inducted into the Delaware Sports Museum and Hall of Fame. He died on December 14, 2017.

References

External links
 NFL.com player page

1940 births
2017 deaths
American football defensive backs
American football ends
American football wide receivers
Detroit Lions players
Minnesota Golden Gophers football players
Minnesota Vikings players
New Orleans Saints players
Players of American football from Wilmington, Delaware
Salesianum School alumni